Rebecca Rose Johnson, professionally known as Bekuh Boom (stylized as Bekuh BOOM) is an American singer and songwriter. She featured on two co-written singles: "I Won't Let You Down" by Danish singer Christopher, which charted at #1 on Tracklisten, the official Danish music charts, and "Money" by Norwegian electronic duo Broiler, which peaked at #3 on Norwegian music charts. As of 2016 she has co-written over 10 songs reaching the #1 position on various music charts.

Johnson signed her first publishing deal to Warner Chappell Music at the age of 18.

Early life and career

Early life
Bekuh Boom was born in Orange County, California , on June 21, 1994 with the real name Rebecca Rose Johnson. She stated that she had an interest in music since elementary school. At the age of 11, she started to learn how to write and compose her own melodies for her own songs. In high school, she revealed that she took dance and choreography classes to become a dance instructor and choreographer.

2011-2017: America's Got Talent and Chappell Music contract
In 2011, at the age of 16, Boom participated in American Idol season 10, though she didn't pass the audition. At the age of 18 she signed her first contract with Warner Chappell Music, going on to release her first two collaborations titled 'Money' and 'I Won't Let you Down'.

Later, she landed deals primarily as composer and producer for K-pop artists, where two of the songs that she worked on were picked and released through YG Entertainment, namely "Eyes, Nose, Lips" by Taeyang and "I'm Different" by Hi Suhyun. Prior to becoming a Kpop composer and producer, Boom had composed songs for singers such as R. Kelly, Jordin Sparks and Jessica Mauboy. In 2012 she  was connected with Blackpink via YG Entertainment, where she studied korean with them. In 2016, Boom became the songwriter and producer for two of BlackPink's debut singles, Whistle and Boombayah which occupied the #1 chart on World Digital Song Sales and Circle Digital Chart respectively. Later she published the demo versions on her social media. The next year she worked on Winner's song "Island", which topped the charts.

2018-present: working with Blackpink and solo activities
In 2020 she became the lyricist and composer for the virtual group K/DA, where she provide the voice of Ahri. Later that year she released a solo single called "There’s no Place Like Home". In March 2021, she released the single "Designer Love", with an accompanying music video being released for the song on Johnson’s YouTube’ channel. In August 2022, she released the single "Anime Eyes".

Songwriting credits

Awards and nominations

References

1994 births
Singer-songwriters from California
American women singer-songwriters
K/DA members
 
Living people
21st-century American women singers